Heart of Midlothian F.C., commonly known as Hearts, is a professional football club based in Edinburgh, Scotland. Formed in 1874, the club has employed a manager to run the team since 1901, the first being Peter Fairley.

List of managers
Information correct as of 01/11/20. Only competitive matches are counted

External links
Hearts Manager Profiles
Hearts Managers Records

Notes

References

Managers
 
Heart of Midlothian
Managers